Baklan is a town and a district of Denizli Province, in Turkey's Aegean Region. The town is at a distance of about an hour from the city of Denizli, neighboring the town of Çivril, and it is situated on the road to Ankara.

Name
For the pre-Turkish period, it is deduced that the plain of Baklan corresponded to the settlements named Lounda and Lakèrion (Λακήριον in Ancient greek). The plain and the region was the scene of the final great efforts made after the 1176 Battle of Myriokephalon by the Byzantine Emperor  Manuel I Komnenos in person to drive out and to hold territory against the victorious Seljuk Turks. However, it is inferred that the nomad Turks had already established themselves in Lounda and Lakerion (Baklan).

The subsequent Turkish town was alternatively called Dedeköy, a name which was its official appellation in some periods in the past. The name dede makes reference to the 13th century Seljuk warrior Alp Eren Hüsamettin Gazi Bey, whose tomb is within the town.

Administration, geography, economy
A township depending Çal district until 1990, it was made into a district at that time. 

A large part of the district is covered by the high plain that carries the same name as the town, Baklan Plain, and the town itself is situated on the slopes of the district's only mountain, Beşparmak, 1307 m. high.

The economy is largely based on agriculture.

Neighbourhoods

Balca
Beyelli 
Boğaziçi
Çataloba
Dağal
Gökpınar
Gürlük
Hadim
Hüsamettin Dede
İcikli
Kavaklar
Kirazlı
Konak
Şenyayla

Image gallery

References

Denizli
Populated places in Denizli Province
Districts of Denizli Province